The 2018 Seniors Irish Masters was a senior snooker tournament which took place at Goffs in Kill, County Kildare, Ireland, from 6 to 7 January 2018. It was the second event on the newly created World Seniors Tour.
The tournament was won by Steve Davis.

Prize fund
The breakdown of prize money is shown below:
Winner: £5,000
Runner-up: £2,000
Semi-finals: £800
Quarter-finals: £400
Highest break: £500
Total: £10,700

Main draw

* A re-spotted black ball shootout replaced final frame deciders at 2–2.

Final

Notes 
Patrick Wallace replaced Julian Logue who withdrew from the tournament.

References 

World Seniors Tour
2018 in snooker
2018 in Irish sport
Snooker competitions in Ireland
Sport in County Kildare
Seniors Irish Masters